Fouchères may refer to the following communes of France:

Fouchères, Aube, in the Aube department
Fouchères, Yonne, in the Yonne department
Fouchères-aux-Bois, in the Meuse department